A yari is  a Japanese weapon.

Yari may also refer to:

Places
 Yari, Benin, a village
 Yari, Iran, a village in Kermanshah Province, Iran
 Yarí River, a river in Colombia
 Mount Yari, a mountain in Japan

People

People with the surname
 Abbas Yari (born 1951), Iranian journalist and film critic
 Abdul'aziz Abubakar Yari (born 1968), Nigerian politician
 Akram Yari, Maoist political organizer in Afghanistan
 Al-Haj Suliman Yari (1936–2013), Afghan politician
 Ali Mohammad Yari, Paralympian athlete from Iran
 Bob Yari (born 1961), Iranian-born American film producer
 Hossein Yari (born in 1968), Iranian actor

People with the given name
 Yari Allnutt (born 1970), retired soccer player from the United States
 Yari Kirkland or Jari Kirkland (born 1976), American ski mountaineer and marathon mountain biker
 Yari Silvera (born 1976), Uruguayan former footballer

Other uses
 Yari language, a spurious language of Colombia
 Sony Ericsson Yari, a mobile phone

See also
 Yarri (disambiguation)
 Yarrie (disambiguation)